Georges Julien Giraud (22 July 1889 – 16 March 1943) was a French mathematician, working in potential theory, partial differential equations, singular integrals and singular integral equations: he is mainly known for his solution of the regular oblique derivative problem and also for his extension to –dimensional singular integral equations of the concept of symbol of a singular integral, previously introduced by Solomon Mikhlin.

Biography

Honors

The scientific work of Georges Giraud was widely acknowledged and earned him several prizes, mainly, but not exclusively, awarded him by the French Academy of Sciences: he was seven times recipient of academy prizes.

In 1919, he was awarded the "Prix Francœur" for his work on the theory of automorphic functions: the members of the commission who examined his work and nominated him were Camille Jordan, Paul Appell, Marie Georges Humbert, Jacques Hadamard, Édouard Goursat, Joseph Boussinesq, Léon Lecornu and Emile Picard (the relator). For the same motivation, On 17 December 1923 he was awarded the "Gustave Roux" prize.

In 1924 he won the Hirn Foundation Prize, for his whole scientific work: he won again the same prize in 1935, for his work on singularities of boundary value problems in the theory of partial differential equations.

In 1928 Giraud won the "Grand Prix des sciences Mathématiques" for his work in the theory of partial differential equations: for the same motivation, in 1930 he was also awarded the "Prix Houllevigue". In the same year, he was also awarded the prize of the Lasserre foundation.

In 1933 he was recipient of the Prix Saintour, for his work on partial differential and integral equations.

Finally, in 1935, apart from winning the Hirn foundation prize for a second time, he was awarded the prize of the Annali della Reale Scuola Normale Superiore di Pisa, equally divided between him, Guido Ascoli and Pietro Buzano: the members of the jury who awarded ex-aequo the prize were Guido Fubini, Mauro Picone and Giovanni Sansone.

On 14 December 1936, following up a proposal Jacques Hadamard made since 1931, he was elected corresponding member of the French Academy of Sciences.

He was also a member of the Société Mathématique de France from 1913 to his death.

Selected publications

Articles

.
, available at NUMDAM. This is one of the first papers, together with independent works of Francesco Tricomi and Solomon Mikhlin, dealing with the multidimensional theory of singular integrals.
, available at Gallica. In this short note, Giraud extends (without proof) the formula for the composition of two 2-dimensional singular integral operators using their symbols, introduced shortly before by Solomon Grigor'evich Mikhlin, to higher dimensional singular integrals.

Books
.
, available from the Internet Archive.
 (available from the "Edizione Nazionale Mathematica Italiana"). A book collecting the winning papers of the 1935 prize of the Annali della Reale Scuola Normale Superiore di Pisa.

See also 
Cauchy principal value
Potential theory
Singular integral

Notes

References

Biographical references 

.
.
.
.
.
.
.
, available at Gallica. The announcement of the death of Georges Giraud given at the seance of 29 March 1943 at the French Academy.
, available at Gallica. The "Address" of Gabriel Bertrand of 20 December 1943 at the French Academy: he gives biographical sketches of the lives of recently deceased members, including Pieter Zeeman, David Hilbert and Georges Giraud.
. The biographical entry about Georges Giraud at the Enciclopedia Treccani.
 (Giraud and other prize recipients thanks are reported at p. 322 of the same volume), available at Gallica.
, available at Gallica.
 (Giraud and other prize recipients thanks are reported at p. 1580 of the same volume), available at Gallica.
 (Giraud and other prize recipients thanks are reported at p. 1270 of the same volume), available at Gallica.
 (Giraud and other prize recipients thanks are reported at p. 1270 of the same volume), available at Gallica.
 (Giraud and other prize recipients thanks are reported at p. 1562 of the same volume), available at Gallica.
 (Giraud and other recipients thanks are reported at p. 1308 of the same volume), available at Gallica.
, available at Gallica. The announcement of the election of Georges Giraud as corresponding member of the "Geometry" section of the French Academy.
, available at Gallica. The year 1939 list of corresponding members of the "Geometry" section of the French Academy.
, available at NUMDAM.
 (available from the "Edizione Nazionale Mathematica Italiana"). The "Preface" of Leonida Tonelli to the book .

General references

, available at Gallica.
. A short "notice nécrologique" (obituary) published on the periodic special issue dedicated to obituary notices of the journal of the A–Ulm, the association of former students, students and friends of the École Normale Supérieure.

References describing the scientific contributions of Giraud

. A masterpiece in the multidimensional theory of singular integrals and singular integral equations summarizing all the results from the beginning to the year of publication, and also sketching the history of the subject.
.
.
 (also available as ).
, is an annotated bibliography written by Francesco Tricomi in order to give a complete survey of his scientific work.

1889 births
1943 deaths
20th-century French mathematicians
Members of the French Academy of Sciences
Mathematical analysts
PDE theorists